Richard Sterne (c. 1596–1683) was a Church of England priest, Archbishop of York from 1664 to 1683.

Life

He was educated at Trinity College, Cambridge, where he graduated MA in 1618, BD in 1625 and DD in 1635. He was elected a fellow of Benet College (now Corpus Christi College), Cambridge in 1623 and then served as Master of Jesus College, Cambridge from 1634.

Around 1633, he became chaplain to Archbishop Laud. From 1642, he held the rectories of Yeovilton and Harleton. A Royalist, he was arrested and imprisoned by the Parliamentarians later the same year. In 1644, he was formally dismissed as Master of Jesus and, in 1645, he lost his rectories, although he was released from prison.

At the Restoration in 1660, Sterne was appointed Bishop of Carlisle — he was elected to the See on 15 November 1660, confirmed 1 December, and consecrated a bishop on 2 December 1660. From there he was translated to York in 1664 — he was elected to that See on 28 April and confirmed on 31 May. He is said to have been one of those who assisted in revising the Book of Common Prayer in 1662. He also assisted Brian Walton with the English Polyglot Bible and himself wrote Summa Logicae (published posthumously in 1685). He founded scholarships at both Corpus Christi and Jesus Colleges.

His great-grandson Laurence Sterne attended Jesus College, Cambridge, and would find literary fame in the 1760s as author of The Life and Opinions of Tristram Shandy, Gent. and live as a curate and parson in Yorkshire.

References

Sources

Archbishops of York
17th-century Anglican archbishops
Alumni of Trinity College, Cambridge
Doctors of Divinity
Fellows of Corpus Christi College, Cambridge
Fellows of Jesus College, Cambridge
Masters of Jesus College, Cambridge
1590s births
1683 deaths
Bishops of Carlisle
17th-century Church of England bishops